Maloye Fomino is a rural locality (a village) in Krasnopolyanskoye Rural Settlement, Nikolsky District, Vologda Oblast, Russia. The population was 23 as of 2002.

Geography 
Maloye Fomino is located 7 km northeast of Nikolsk (the district's administrative centre) by road. Irdanovo is the nearest rural locality.

References 

Rural localities in Nikolsky District, Vologda Oblast